Timothy McCarthy Downing (11 May 1814 – 9 January 1879) was an Irish Liberal Party and Home Rule League politician. He was Liberal Member of Parliament (MP) for County Cork from 1868 to 1874, and then a Home Rule League MP for the same constituency until his death in 1879.
McCarthy Downing was a solicitor, and Prospect House, Skibbereen was the family house, which later became the Bishop Residence. He is buried in Old Caheragh Graveyard, Skibbereen.

References

External links
 

1814 births
1879 deaths
Home Rule League MPs
Irish Liberal Party MPs
Members of the Parliament of the United Kingdom for County Cork constituencies (1801–1922)
UK MPs 1868–1874
UK MPs 1874–1880